Emily's tuco-tuco (Ctenomys emilianus) is a species of rodent in the family Ctenomyidae. It is endemic to Argentina.

Description
The coat is a uniform, glossy fawn or pale greyish-brown, often with an almost pink cast, and no black markings. The flanks and underparts are whitish, and this colouring extends onto the thighs and hips, contrasting with the much browner colour of the rump. The feet and tail are whitish and there is hardly any black in the crest on the tail.

Distribution and habitat
Emily's tuco-tuco is endemic to west central Argentina where it is present as several separate populations in the Province of Neuquén.

References

Tuco-tucos
Mammals of Argentina
Endemic fauna of Argentina
Mammals described in 1926
Taxa named by Oldfield Thomas
Taxonomy articles created by Polbot